Suphis is a genus of beetles in the family Noteridae, containing the following species:

 Suphis cimicoides Aubé, 1837
 Suphis fluviatilis Guignot, 1948
 Suphis freudei Mouchamps, 1955
 Suphis globiformis Zimmermann, 1919
 Suphis inflatus (LeConte, 1863)
 Suphis insculpturatus Zimmermann, 1921
 Suphis intermedius Régimbart, 1903
 Suphis minutus Régimbart, 1903
 Suphis notaticollis Zimmermann, 1921
 Suphis ticky Grosso, 1993
 Suphis werneri Guignot, 1940

References

Noteridae